Netherthorpe can refer to various locations in England:

Netherthorpe, Derbyshire
Netherthorpe, Sheffield, a suburb of Sheffield
Netherthorpe Airfield, near Worksop